Sultana Razia is a Bangladesh Jamaat-e-Islami politician and the former Member of Bangladesh Parliament from a reserved seat.

Career 
Sultana Razia was a Member of Parliament nominated by the Bangladesh Jamaat-e-Islami candidate from the reserved women's seat 33 of the 8th Jatiya Sangsad.

References 

Living people
Year of birth missing (living people)
People from Jamalpur District
Bangladesh Jamaat-e-Islami politicians
Women members of the Jatiya Sangsad
8th Jatiya Sangsad members
21st-century Bangladeshi women politicians